Siddapur is a village in the Kundapur taluk of Udupi district in the Indian state of Karnataka. 

The village's name is derived from Siddeshwara Devastana..

Infrastructure 
A dam built across the Varahi River is nearby. 

The Varahi irrigation project and powerplant is about 5 km from Siddapur.

Geography 
Agumbe is about 30 km distant. A village near Siddapur is known as Ulloor-74.

Climate 
It is a typical South Canara village, hot during summer and heavy rains during monsoon .

Transport 
The nearest railway station is Kundapur .

Demographics 
It is mainly a Bunts community-dominated area.

Economy 
The village has Gokul Industries' cashew nut factory, which also produces fruit and vegetable chips.

Temples 
A temple of devi Bhuvaneshwari is situated near Gunjagodu . It is about 25  km from Kundapur. The Anegudde temple is 32 km distant. 

Ulloor-74 has the Banashankari Devasthana temple.

References

Villages in Udupi district